St Philomena's Catholic High School for Girls is a school for girls (aged 11–18) in Carshalton, South London, England. Ofsted rates the school as 'good' and the Archdiocese of Southwark found the establishment to be 'a very strong school'. the Chair of Governors is Dr. M Howard, the Headteacher is Ms M Noone.

History

Foundation
The school was founded by the Daughters of the Cross in 1893 and is situated in twenty-five acres of parkland with some notable buildings. The main building on the property was once Carshalton House, a grand manor house built in the early eighteenth century by Edward Carleton. It was the home of the noted physician, Dr. John Radcliffe until his death in 1714. Other owners included Sir John Fellowes, Sub-Governor of the South Sea Company; Lord Anson, admiral; and Philip Yorke, 1st Earl of Hardwicke, Lord High Chancellor.

Modern
In 1999 the school was featured in Rock band Travis' musical video for hit single Driftwood.
In 2004, the school was awarded Technology College status. In April 2006, it was awarded a Language College status alongside the Technology College status. In 2007, a new Learning Resource Centre, including a library, was opened. In 2016, a new classroom block opened.

The school should not be confused with St. Philomena's School at St. Mary Cray near Orpington, Kent, a RC foundation operating from the 1950s.

School Houses

References

External links

St. Philomena's School website

Girls' schools in London
Educational institutions established in 1893
Secondary schools in the London Borough of Sutton
Catholic secondary schools in the Archdiocese of Southwark
1893 establishments in England
Voluntary aided schools in London